"Blue Side of Lonesome" is a song written and recorded by Leon Payne in 1960.

Jim Reeves Recording
It is most famously known from the posthumous 1966 single by Jim Reeves. Reeves had previously recorded this song on his 1962 album, The Country Side of Jim Reeves.   The single was Reeves' fifth posthumous release to reach number one on the U.S. country music chart. "Blue Side of Lonesome" stayed at number one for a single week and spent a total of nineteen weeks on the chart.

Chart performance

Cover Versions
George Jones also released a version on his 1966 album, Love Bug.

References

1966 singles
Jim Reeves songs
Songs written by Leon Payne
Songs released posthumously
Song recordings produced by Chet Atkins
RCA Records singles
1966 songs